The Diamond Mine is the second mixtape from American hip-hop artist Diamond D. It was released on September 15, 2005, through Diamond D's own Dymond Mine imprint. The mixtape was not carried in most retail stores, but is available for purchase online. The Diamond Mine features production from Diamond, The 45 King, Nottz and The Alchemist, as well as appearances from Fat Joe, J Dilla, Xzibit, and Brand Nubian's Grand Puba and Sadat X.

Track listing

Diamond D albums
Albums produced by the Alchemist (musician)
Albums produced by Nottz
Albums produced by Diamond D
2005 compilation albums